Mohamed Lagraâ (born November 7, 1986 in Aïn Kermes) is an Algerian footballer who plays for Algerian Ligue Professionnelle 1 club MC Oran. He can play as a left-back or a defensive midfielder.

During his time with ES Sétif, Lagraâ won the Algerian Ligue Professionnelle 1 in 2012–13 and the 2014 CAF Champions League.

Honours

Club
ES Sétif
 Algerian Ligue Professionnelle 1: 2012–13, 2014–15
 CAF Champions League: 2014
 CAF Super Cup: 2015

USM Bel Abbès
 Algerian Cup: 2018
 Algerian Super Cup : 2018

References

External links

1986 births
Algerian footballers
Algerian Ligue Professionnelle 1 players
Association football defenders
ES Sétif players
JS Saoura players
JSM Tiaret players
Living people
People from Aïn Kermes
USM El Harrach players
USM Bel Abbès players
MC Oran players
21st-century Algerian people